UrbanDaddy is a company based in New York which published content about men's luxury lifestyle topics. As of August 2012, its websites and newsletters have more than 4.5 million subscriber in ten U.S. markets. UrbanDaddy publishes a daily email newsletter covering a single piece of news pertaining to nightlife, food and dining as well as lifestyle and entertainment. The company is privately held, with a business model supported by advertising revenue and e-commerce.

History

UrbanDaddy was founded in 2005, by CEO Lance Broumand. Broumand left a career in law to start UrbanDaddy. In addition to UrbanDadddy's lifestyle content the company also publishes reports about luxury automobiles on a web site called Driven.com and editorial focused on men's style on GetKempt.com. In 2011, UrbanDaddy launched Manero, a digital publication and social club for Latin Americans living in the United States.

References

February 24, 2012 by Gavin O'Malley "UrbanDaddy's Broumand on Positioning Luxury Readers, Digital Growth" Media Post. http://www.mediapost.com/publications/article/168553/urbandaddys-broumand-on-positioning-luxury-reader.html
August 11, 2008 by Hoag Levins "UrbanDaddy: Finding Publishing Success in Web 1:0 Simplicity" Advertising Age. http://adage.com/article/video/urbandaddy-finding-publishing-success-web-1-0-simplicity/130249/
 December 23, 2010 by Sarah Wildman "Stars of the See-and-Be_Seen Upend Washington," New York Times.  https://www.nytimes.com/2010/12/26/fashion/26DCgirls.html?pagewanted=all
 October 13, 2011 by Courtney Boyd Myers "150,000 men use UrbanDaddy's Next Move app to entertain their mistresses," The Next Web. https://thenextweb.com/apps/2011/10/13/150000-men-use-urbandaddys-next-move-app-to-entertain-their-mistresses/

Companies based in New York (state)